Julia Golovina (born 30 May 1982) is a Ukrainian former competitive ice dancer. With former partner Oleg Voiko, she is the 2003 Ukrainian national champion. They competed at the 2002 Winter Olympics and the 2006 Winter Olympics, placing 21st and 23rd, respectively. Their highest placement at an ISU Championship was 15th at the 2003 and 2004 European Figure Skating Championships.

Initially a singles skater, Golovina took up ice dancing at 14 years old. She competed for Russia with Denis Egorov for four years. They placed sixth at the 1999 World Junior Championships. In 2000, she teamed up with Oleg Voiko.

COACHING
Golovina started coaching in 2003. 
As of 2015, Golovina began coaching primarily in Farmers Branch, Texas.

Results
GP: Grand Prix; JGP: Junior Grand Prix

With Voiko for Ukraine

With Egorov for Russia

References

External links

 

Ukrainian female ice dancers
Russian female ice dancers
Olympic figure skaters of Ukraine
Figure skaters at the 2002 Winter Olympics
Figure skaters at the 2006 Winter Olympics
1982 births
Living people
Sportspeople from Kharkiv
Universiade medalists in figure skating
Universiade silver medalists for Russia
Competitors at the 2001 Winter Universiade
Competitors at the 2005 Winter Universiade